Tonearm is the stage name of Russian-born, New York-based musician Ilia Bis (Илья Бис). Bis grew up in Moscow and later moved to the United States to study mathematics and computer sound analysis. After doing graduate work at the University of Chicago, he decided to pursue music full-time.

Tonearm usually performs as a one-man band, combining electronic processing with singing and playing an electric guitar. He also collaborates closely with video artists, and all shows are accompanied by tightly-scripted live video projections. Despite not having released a full record to date, Tonearm has received considerable critical attention both in the United States and in his native Russia for his strong songwriting and original production.  In 2006, he was reportedly working on a debut album.

References

External links 
Official website
Tonearm's instrumental music on myspace.com
Radio Liberty article
Moscow Times article

American electronic musicians
American male singer-songwriters
American singer-songwriters
Intelligent dance musicians
Russian emigrants to the United States
University of Chicago alumni
Ableton Live users
Living people

Year of birth missing (living people)